Unrestricted may refer to:
 Unrestricted (Da Brat album)
 Unrestricted (Symphorce album)
 Unrestricted carry, a situation within a jurisdiction in which the carrying of firearms is not restricted in any way by the law